Lukang, formerly romanized as Lugang and also known by other names, is an urban township in northwestern Changhua County, Taiwan. The township is on the west coast of Taiwan, facing the Taiwan Strait. Lukang was an important sea port in the 18th century and 19th century. It was the most populous city in central Taiwan until the early 20th century. In March 2012, it was named one of the Top 10 Small Tourist Towns by the Tourism Bureau of Taiwan.

Name
The township's name, which means "Deer Port", came from its deerskin trade during the Dutch period. Its old Taiwanese name was Lok-a-kang and its shortened version is seen in English texts and maps as variants such as Lok-kang, Lokang and Lo-kiang.

In 2011, the Ministry of Interior decided to keep the historical Wade-Giles spelling "Lukang" and abandon the change to the Pinyin spelling "Lugang" consistent with the switch to Tongyong Pinyin in 2002 and later Hanyu Pinyin 2009.

History
 
An important trading port during Lukang's heyday from 1785 to 1845, Lukang's population reached 20,000. Lukang was Taiwan's second largest city after Tainan and was larger than Bangka (now a district of Taipei), then the island's third-largest city. The rice industry brought great wealth to the city. During the late 1800s the most prominent families in Lukang were the Huang and Koo clans.

The subsequent silting of the harbor and the city's refusal to allow railroads to pass through the city led to losses in trade in commerce, which, in turn led to Lukang's decline relative to other cities, which were experiencing considerable urbanization and population growth.  This same decline, however, averted the modernization processes that demolished historical buildings in Tainan and Taipei, leaving Lukang preserved as it was in the past.

During the period of Japanese rule, the city was Taiwan's fifth most populous city, with a population of 19,805 according to the December 1904 census. The Hoklo people in the area were predominantly of Xiamen and Quanzhou origin, thereby speaking the Quanzhou dialect of Hokkien. Nanguan music is highly popular in Lukang and originates from Quanzhou.

In 1920, Lukang was governed as  under Shōka District of Taichū Prefecture.

Overview

There are many old temples in Lukang, such as Longshan Temple and Matzu Temple. The city boasts over 200 temples dedicated to a wide variety of folk deities. The town is also the origin of the terms "ē-káng" (下港) and "téng-káng" (頂港) used respectively to refer to southern Taiwan and northern Taiwan; the literal meanings of the terms are "below the harbor" and "above the harbor".

The Yu Jen Jai (玉珍齋) cakes are famous local specialties, as well as Lukang's Ox Tongue Cakes (牛舌餅) and oyster pancakes. It will host the 2012 Taiwan Lantern Festival, beating out six other contenders.

Lukang encompasses  with a population of 85,423, including 43,199 males and 42,224 females as of January 2023.

Administrative divisions

The township comprises 29 villages, which are Dayou, Zhongxing, Luojin, Shunxing, Pulun, Xingong, Yushun, Tungshi, Guocuo, Yongan, Jingfu, Taixing, Zhangxing, Xinghua, Longshan, Caiyuan, Jiewei, Zhaoan, Haipu, Yangcuo, Caozhong, Tounan, Shanlun, Dingpan, Toulun, Gouqi, Liaocuo, Tungqi and Dingcuo.

Infrastructure
 Hsingneng Power Plant
 Hsingyuan Power Plant

Tourist attractions

 BRAND'S Health Museum
 Chang Bin Show-Chwan Health Mall
 Eight Wonders
 Lukang Ai Gate
 Lukang Artist Village
 Lukang Culture Center
 Lukang Folk Arts Museum
 Lukang Kinmen Hall
 Lukang Longshan Temple
 Lukang Rimao Hang
 Lukang Tianhou Temple
 Lukang Wen Wu Temple
 No Heaven Street
 Taiwan Glass Gallery & Glass Temple

In popular culture 
The town was referenced in the 1982 song "Lukang, The Small Town" (鹿港小鎮) by Lo Ta-yu.

Notable natives
 Chao Shou-po, politician, educator, civic activist and lawyer
 Koo Hsien-jung, former businessperson
 Koo Chen-fu, businessman, diplomat
 Koo Kwang-ming, politician
 Stan Shih, Co-founder & Honorary Chairman of Acer Inc.
 Li Ang, writer
 Shi Shuqing, writer

References

Citations

Bibliography

External links

 

Townships in Changhua County